When the North Wind Blows is a 1974 American film written and directed by Stewart Raffill. It gave a rare lead role to Henry Brandon.

It was also known as The Snow Tiger. Which was shot in New Mexico.

Cast
Henry Brandon as Avakum
Herbert Nelson as Boris
Dan Haggerty as Tsezar
Henry Olek as Ivan
Sander Johnson as Peter
Rex Holman as Sergei
Dale Ishimoto as Yermak

Production
The film was shot in Alberta, Canada.

References

External links
When the North Wind Blows at IMDb
When the North Wind Blows at BFI

1974 films
1974 drama films
American drama films
Films directed by Stewart Raffill
Films scored by Jimmie Haskell
Films shot in Alberta
1970s English-language films
1970s American films